Roland Cooper State Park is a state-owned, contractor-operated public recreation area located six miles north of Camden, Alabama, on the eastern shore of Dannelly Reservoir, a  impoundment of the Alabama River known locally as the Millers Ferry Reservoir. The park features cottages, campground, fishing, and boating facilities.

History
The  state park opened as Bridgeport State Park on land leased from the Army Corps of Engineers following the construction of Miller's Ferry Lock and Dam in 1969. The park was renamed for state senator William Roland Cooper in the 1970s. It was one of several Alabama state parks that were closed or saw curtailment of services in 2015 following state budget cuts. The park re-opened in September 2016 under a management agreement with a private contracting company.

References

External links
Roland Cooper State Park Alabama Department of Conservation and Natural Resources

State parks of Alabama
Protected areas of Wilcox County, Alabama